The eighth season of the Thai reality television show, The Voice Thailand premiered on September 16, 2019, on PPTV and LINE TV. Kong Saharat, Jennifer Kim, Joey Boy and Pop Pongkool returning as coaches from the previous season. The show hosted by Songsit Rungnopphakhunsi.

Teams
Color key

Blind Auditions
The Block, added in season 7, returned for a second season, the number of available blocks is raised from two to three for each coach.

Also new this season, trios, quartets and bands were allowed onto the show.

Color key

Episode 1 (September 16)

Episode 2 (September 23)

Episode 3 (September 30)

Episode 4 (October 7)

Episode 5 (October 14)

Episode 6 (October 21)

Episode 7 (October 28)

Episode 8 (November 4)

The Knockouts

Color key:

References

External links 
 
 
 
 
 

The Voice Thailand
2019 Thai television seasons